Cathedral City is a brand of Cheddar cheese which is manufactured by Saputo Dairy UK in Cornwall in the United Kingdom. Cathedral City's brand and logo is based on Wells Cathedral in Somerset.

History 
Cathedral City is produced at Davidstow in Cornwall, which has neither city status nor a cathedral. However, the original owners of the brand, Mendip Foods, were based in the cathedral city of Wells in Somerset. Dairy Crest bought the brand from Mendip Foods Ltd in July 1995.

In 2019, Saputo bought Dairy Crest. 

The brand was officially launched in Canada and the United States in 2020.

Health research 
In 2014, Cathedral City was cited in research published by the British Medical Journal highlighting the fact that branded cheeses generally had higher salt content than supermarket own-brands.

Reception 
In the 2012 ranking of all businesses in the UK, compiled by YouGov’s BrandIndex, Cathedral City was rated as the country's tenth most popular brand and the most popular food or drink.

References

English cheeses
Cornish cheeses
British Royal Warrant holders
Food brands of the United Kingdom